Loveless Fascination is the fourth album by Starship. It is the first studio album of new material released by the band since 1989's Love Among the Cannibals, with Mickey Thomas as the lone remaining holdover from the group's 1980's line-up.

Loveless Fascination was produced by longtime Foreigner bassist Jeff Pilson, who was the main songwriter on the album, and helped contribute a harder edge to the band's sound. Frontman Thomas said "It's been a long time coming. With each passing year, the bar was raised higher and higher for this album. I'd be lying if I didn't tell you the expectations caused me a few sleepless nights."

All tracks were produced and engineered by Jeff Pilson at Pilsound Studios in Santa Clarita, CA, as well as being mixed and mastered by Wyn Davis at Total Access Recording Studios in Redondo Beach, except "You Never Know" and "Nothin' Can Keep Me from You", which were produced by Mickey Thomas and engineered and mixed by Vinnie Castaldo at The Tone Factory in Las Vegas.

"You Never Know" is a Richard Page co-composition and "Nothin' Can Keep Me from You" was written by Diane Warren for Detroit Rock City and previously recorded by Kiss.

Track listing
All songs written and composed by Jeff Pilson, unless otherwise noted.

Personnel
 Mickey Thomas - vocals, guitar; production (tracks 8, 10)
 Stephanie Calvert - vocals
 Darrell Verdusco - drums, vocals
 Phil Bennett - keyboards, vocals
 Jeff Adams - bass, vocals
 John Roth - guitar, vocals

Special guest
 Jeff Pilson - guitar, bass, keyboards, vocals; production (tracks 1-7, 9)

Additional personnel
 Mark Abrahamian - guitar
 Mark Schulman - drums
 Chris Frazier - drums
 John Wedemeyer - guitar

References

External links

Starship Working on New Album, 'Loveless Fascination' - RollingStone.com
Mickey Thomas Talks New Starship Album, 'Loveless Fascination,' and Remembers Guitarist Mark Abrahamian - guitarworld.com

2013 albums
Starship (band) albums
Albums produced by Jeff Pilson